The 2021–22 FA Women's League Cup was the eleventh edition of the FA Women's Super League and FA Women's Championship's league cup competition. It was sponsored by Continental AG, who sponsored the competition since its creation, and was officially known as the FA Women's Continental League Cup for sponsorship reasons. All 24 teams from the FA WSL and Championship contested the competition. Chelsea were the defending champions. They lost in the final against Manchester City 3–1, who won their fourth title.

Format changes
The competition featured a group stage split regionally. However, the number of groups was reduced from six to five: two in the North and three in the South. In a change from previous years, teams competing in the UEFA Women's Champions League group stage were exempt from the League Cup group stage, earning a provisional bye to the quarter-finals. As a result, the initial group stage draw featured 22 of the 24 teams: one Northern group had five teams drawn into it with the remaining Northern group and all three Southern groups initially featuring four teams each. The three teams excluded from the draw were Chelsea, who automatically entered the Champions League group stage and therefore joined the League Cup at the quarter-final stage, and Manchester City and Arsenal who went through the Champions League qualifying rounds. Should either team be eliminated during qualification, they would enter the League Cup group stage and be drawn into an existing group of four in their geographical region.

The first place team in each of the five groups qualified for the quarter-finals, and were joined by the two UEFA Women's Champions League teams, Chelsea and Arsenal. Because Manchester City entered the group stage of the League Cup following their elimination from the second qualifying round of the Champions League, the best-placed runner-up also progressed with the five group winners.

Group stage

Group A

Group B

Group C

Group D

Group E

Ranking of second-placed teams
Due to Manchester City's failure to progress from Champions League qualifying, they entered the League Cup group stage. With only two teams now receiving byes to the League Cup quarter-finals, the best-placed runner-up will also progress with the five group winners to make up the final eight. With the three Southern groups containing one fewer team than the two Northern groups, the ranking to determine which second-placed team progresses is calculated on a points-per-game basis.

Knock-out stage

Quarter-finals
Chelsea entered the League Cup at the quarter-final stage having been exempt from the League Cup group stage due to their automatic participation in the Champions League group stage. Arsenal also entered at this stage having progressed from the Champions League qualifying rounds. The ties took place on 19 January 2022.

Semi-finals
The semi-finals took place between 2-3 February 2022.

Final

On 20 December 2021, it was announced the 2022 FA Women's League Cup Final would be held at Plough Lane, the home of AFC Wimbledon, for the first time. The final was scheduled to take place on 5 March 2022.

See also
2021–22 FA WSL
2021–22 FA Women's Championship

References

External links
Official website

FA Women's League Cup
Cup